Alastair Thomas Arthur Allchin (born 12 November 1991) is an English former first-class cricketer.

Allchin was born at Chelmsford in November 1991. He was educated at Sandon School, before going up Anglia Ruskin University. While studying at Anglia Ruskin, Allchin played first-class cricket for Cambridge MCCU, making his debut against Essex at Fenner's in 2013. He made two further first-class appearances for Cambridge MCCU in 2016, against Essex and Nottinghamshire. He scored a total of 103 runs in his three first-class matches, at an average of 25.75 and a high score of 59 not out. With his right-arm fast-medium bowling, he took 6 wickets at a bowling average of 84.16, with best figures of 2 for 41.

Notes and references

External links

1991 births
Living people
Sportspeople from Chelmsford
Alumni of Anglia Ruskin University
English cricketers
Cambridge MCCU cricketers